The British International School of Brussels (BISB) is a small primary school in Belgium. It was established in 2000 and in April 2008 expanded into separate infant and junior departments. The school provides education based on the English National curriculum for children of more than 30 different nationalities.

BISB is an independent, fee financed school situated in the south of Schaerbeek near the RTBF television centre. The school’s 2008 Independent Schools Inspectorate report notes that “Pupils have a strong sense of self-esteem. They feel valued and are happy and confident, as the school has an atmosphere of respect and care for others”.

The school was the first school in continental Europe to have Promethean interactive whiteboards installed with the integrated projector and now has interactive whiteboards installed in every classroom from the Nursery to year 6.

BISB is a non-selective entry school and prior to admission, most pupils undergo informal interviews with the Headteacher, if they are in Belgium. Admission is also subject to the availability of spaces in the required year group.

External links

British International School of Brussels
ISI Inspection report	https://web.archive.org/web/20100505235457/http://www.isi.net/School.aspx?s=7443

Educational institutions established in 2000
International schools in Belgium
Schools in Brussels
2000 establishments in Belgium